Teuchocnemis lituratus , (Loew, 1863), the  The Black Spur Fly , is an uncommon species of syrphid fly observed in the eastern half of North America. Syrphid flies are also known as Hover Flies or Flower Flies because the adults are frequently found hovering around flowers from which they feed on nectar and pollen. The larvae are unknown.

Distribution
Canada, United States.

References

Eristalinae
Insects described in 1863
Taxa named by Hermann Loew
Diptera of North America
Hoverflies of North America